Trunovsky (masculine), Trunovskaya (feminine), or Trunovskoye (neuter) may refer to:
Trunovsky District, a district of Stavropol Krai, Russia
Trunovsky (rural locality) (Trunovskaya, Trunovskoye), name of several rural localities in Russia